Silver King (January 11, 1868 – May 21, 1938), born Charles Frederick Koenig in St. Louis, Missouri, was a Major League Baseball player from 1886 through 1897.

In a 10-year career, spent primarily as a pitcher, King played for the Kansas City Cowboys (1886), St. Louis Browns (1887–89), Chicago Pirates (1890), Pittsburgh Pirates (1891), New York Giants (1892–93), Cincinnati Reds (1893), and Washington Senators (1896–97). The first part of King's nickname was a reference to the color of his hair, while the latter part was a translation of his German surname.

King was an unusual pitcher for his time. Gripping the ball with unusually large hands, he delivered the ball without a windup. He was also one of the first pitchers in major league history to employ a sidearm delivery. The unconventional methods worked, as he went on to pitch 3,190 innings, winning 203 games with 1229 strikeouts and a 3.18 earned run average in 397 games. His strong fastball enabled him to become a notable strikeout artist; he finished among the league's top 10 in that category six times.

King's best season came in 1888, when he led the Browns to their fourth consecutive American Association championship. That year, King led the league with 585 innings pitched in 66 games, 45 wins, and a 1.64 ERA. In 1890, he jumped to Chicago of the Players' League and added another ERA title while winning 30 games. On June 21, 1890, King threw a no-hitter for Chicago, the only one in the league's one-year history. (King lost 1–0, and pitched only eight innings in the loss, so this game is not officially recognized by MLB as a no-hitter.)

After baseball, King returned to his native St. Louis. He died in 1938, at age 70, and was buried at New St. Marcus Cemetery in St. Louis.

See also
List of Major League Baseball career wins leaders
List of Major League Baseball annual wins leaders
List of Major League Baseball annual ERA leaders
List of Major League Baseball annual shutout leaders
List of St. Louis Cardinals team records

External links

 , or Baseball Almanac

1868 births
1938 deaths
19th-century baseball players
Major League Baseball pitchers
Kansas City Cowboys (NL) players
St. Louis Browns (AA) players
Chicago Pirates players
Pittsburgh Pirates players
New York Giants (NL) players
Cincinnati Reds players
Washington Senators (1891–1899) players
St. Joseph Reds players
Baseball players from St. Louis
American people of German descent